The National Graves Association (NGA; , "Grave Committee of Heroes of the Gaels") is an Irish organisation which seeks to maintain the graves of Irish republicans who died in the pursuit of a united Ireland. Its stated objectives are "to restore, where necessary, and maintain fittingly the graves and memorials of our patriot dead of every generation; to commemorate those who died in the cause of Irish Freedom; to compile a record of such graves and memorials". It is not affiliated with the Government of the Republic of Ireland or Government of Northern Ireland. It is also an entirely separate organisation to the National Graves Association, Belfast.

Policy and history
Its 'guiding principle' is "Only a 32 County Irish Republic represents the true aspiration of those who gave their lives for Irish freedom". As a result, it does not look after the graves of British soldiers or Irish soldiers who were on the pro-treaty side in the Irish Civil War. It is an autonomous body, with no affiliation to any political party, organisation, or group.

It was formed in 1926 and has its origins in the many associations established in the late 19th century to erect memorials over the graves of prominent Irish Republican Brotherhood members and others. Since its establishment, the NGA has erected, or accepted into its care, over 500 monuments and memorials throughout Ireland. The NGA also publishes The Last Post, which contains the names of republicans who died in pursuit of republican objectives since 1916.
Members of the governing body are not allowed by the rules to be a member of any political party. This rule does not apply to associates.

Gallery

References

External links
NGA website

1926 establishments in Ireland
Irish republican organisations
Military cemeteries
Organizations established in 1926